Hector Arana is an NHRA Full Throttle Drag Racing Pro Stock Motorcycle racer.  In the 2009 season he won the Motorcycle season championship.

References

Living people
Year of birth missing (living people)
Place of birth missing (living people)
American motorcycle racers
Motorcycle drag racers